Davarunuiyeh (also Romanized as Dāvarānū’īyeh and Davaranoo’eyeh; also known as Dābrū’īyeh and Dābrūnū’īyeh) is a village in Jorjafak Rural District, in the Central District of Zarand County, Kerman Province, Iran. At the 2006 census, its population was 35, in 10 families.

References 

Populated places in Zarand County